Hisae (written: , ,  or  in katakana) is a feminine Japanese given name. Notable people with the name include:

, Japanese photographer
, Japanese manga artist
, Japanese football referee
, Japanese ceramist

Japanese feminine given names